Anders Krohn (born 15 November 1987) is a Norwegian racing driver from Stavanger.

Racing career
After a youth in karting, Krohn moved to cars in the Swedish Junior Touring Car Championship in 2006. In 2007 he primarily raced in Benelux Formula Ford series but made a few appearances in other Formula Ford series and participated in the Formula Ford Festival, finishing 11th in Duratec class. In 2008 he moved to the United States and competed in the F2000 Championship Series for Andersen Racing where he won the championship. In 2009 he competed for Mundill in the Star Mazda Championship, winning at the Milwaukee Mile and finishing 6th in points. For the 2010 season he stayed in Star Mazda but returned to Andersen Racing. He made his Firestone Indy Lights debut for Andersen Racing on July 4 at Watkins Glen International. He finished second in Star Mazda points despite not winning a race thanks to finishing sixth or better in every race. He raced full-time in Firestone Indy Lights in 2011 for Belardi Auto Racing in the team's first season in Indy Lights. He finished seventh in points with a best finish of fifth (twice). In 2012 he made two Indy Lights starts (including the Freedom 100) for Bryan Herta Autosport. He finished 20th in points.

Announcing
In 2017 Krohn announced he had accepted a role with NBCSN doing reports and interviews trackside at IndyCar events. As from 2019 he is also a contributor in the Viasat Motor F1 pod focusing on the Indy Car section of the show.

Personal
Krohn currently resides in Houston, Texas. Since he began racing in the United States he has earned the nickname "The Viking" due to his Norwegian heritage.

Racing record

American open–wheel racing results 
(key)

Star Mazda Championship / Pro Mazda Championship

Indy Lights

References

External links

1987 births
Norwegian racing drivers
Indy Lights drivers
Indy Pro 2000 Championship drivers
Formula Ford drivers
Sportspeople from Stavanger
Living people
24 Hours of Daytona drivers
Rolex Sports Car Series drivers

Belardi Auto Racing drivers
Team Pelfrey drivers
Bryan Herta Autosport drivers